The BC Games Society is a provincial crown corporation in British Columbia created in 1977. The organization is the governing body responsible for the BC Summer Games and BC Winter Games, and manages the Team BC program at the Canada Games. Ron Butlin served as the first manager-director of the society from 1977 to 1987.

Host cities

Sports

Summer sports

Winter sports

See also
Canada Games
Canada Summer Games
Canada Winter Games
BC Summer Games
BC Winter Games
Alberta Winter Games
Saskatchewan Games
Manitoba Games
Games Ontario
Quebec Games
Western Canada Summer Games

Participating teams 
Eight zones, each representing a different region of British Columbia, participate in each instalment of the games. The zones and the cities they include are listed as follows.

 Kootenays (Zone 1) – Castlegar, Cranbrook, Fernie, Grand Forks, Kimberley, Nelson, Rossland, Trail
Thompson-Okanagan (Zone 2) – Armstrong, Enderby, Kamloops, Kelowna, Merritt, Peachland, Penticton, Revelstoke, Salmon Arm, Vernon
Fraser Valley (Zone 3) – Abbotsford, Chilliwack, Langley, Maple Ridge, Pitt Meadows
Fraser River (Zone 4) – Burnaby, Coquitlam, New Westminster, Port Coquitlam, Port Moody, Surrey, White Rock 
Vancouver-Coastal (Zone 5) – North Vancouver, Richmond, Vancouver
Vancouver Island-Central Coast (Zone 6) – Campbell River, Courtenay, Duncan, Ladysmith, Nanaimo, Oak Bay, Port Alberni, Powell River, Victoria
North West (Zone 7) – Prince Rupert, Terrace
Cariboo-North East (Zone 8) – Dawson Creek, Fort Nelson, Fort St. John, Prince George, Quesnel, Williams Lake

References

External links
Official website

1977 establishments in British Columbia
Companies based in Victoria, British Columbia
Crown corporations of British Columbia
Sports governing bodies in British Columbia
Sports organizations established in 1977
Multi-sport events in Canada